Alyaksandr Uladzimiravich Yurevich (Belarusian: Аляксандр Юрэвіч; born 8 August 1979, in Lida) is a former Belarusian footballer. He last played for Shakhtyor Soligorsk and has appeared for the Belarus national football team, including qualifying matches for the 2010 FIFA World Cup. He is a defender, preferably left back. He has formerly played for FC BATE Borisov, where he served as vice-captain of the team.

Honours
Shakhtyor Soligorsk
Belarusian Premier League champion: 2005
Belarusian Cup winner: 2003–04, 2013–14

BATE Borisov
Belarusian Premier League champion: 2008, 2009, 2010, 2011, 2012, 2013
Belarusian Cup winner: 2009–10
Belarusian Super Cup winner: 2010, 2011

References

External links
 
 

1979 births
Living people
People from Lida
Belarusian footballers
Association football defenders
Belarus international footballers
FC Lida players
FC Shakhtyor Soligorsk players
FC Karpaty Lviv players
FC BATE Borisov players
Belarusian expatriate footballers
Ukrainian Premier League players
Expatriate footballers in Ukraine
Belarusian expatriate sportspeople in Ukraine
Sportspeople from Grodno Region